Edward Armstrong Bennet MC, (21 October 1888 – 7 March 1977) was an Anglo-Irish decorated army chaplain during World War I, a British and Indian Army psychiatrist in the rank of brigadier during World War II, hospital consultant and author. 

He is known for his long collaboration with Carl Jung which started in the early 1930s and whom he invited to give the influential Tavistock Lectures in London in 1935. He is regarded as one of the earliest practising Jungian analysts in the United Kingdom.

Education
Born in Poyntzpass, Co. Down Northern Ireland, Bennet was educated at Campbell College, Trinity College, Dublin (twice), and Ridley Hall, Cambridge.

Career
After studying Philosophy and Theology at Trinity College, Dublin, Bennet went to Ridley Hall where he was ordained into the Church of England. During the First World War he served as a military chaplain and was awarded the Military Cross for "conspicuous bravery". After hostilities ended he returned to Trinity College, Dublin where he qualified in Medicine in 1925. 
In 1925 he moved to London, where he obtained a post in the West End Hospital for Nervous Diseases. He also joined the Tavistock Clinic, then led by Hugh Crichton-Miller, as an honorary psychiatrist. In the early 1930s he met the Swiss psychiatrist, Carl Jung and invited him to London to give the "Tavistock lectures" in 1935. He was awarded a Doctor of Science degree in 1939.

During World War II Bennet served a command psychiatrist in the India Command and in the 11th Army Group. He was promoted to brigadier. After the war he resumed his close collaboration with Jung which lasted until the latter's death in 1961. He also joined the Royal Bethlem and the Maudsley Hospitals where he remained until his retirement in 1955. He carried on a private practice and was active on church and medical committees. Bennet was for a time a member of the newly formed Society of Analytical Psychology, but fell out with its leader, Michael Fordham. There was a brief reconciliation, however, Bennet resigned permanently in 1963.

Committee work
He served on:
 The Hypnotism Sub-committee of the BMA 1955-6
 The Archbishop of Canterbury's Commission on Spiritual Healing 1954-5
 The Drug addiction Committee of the BMA 1955-6

Personal
Bennet was married to Eveline, his co-author of Meetings with Jung.

Publications
In English:
 What Jung Really Said. Schocken Books; 4th Revised edition (1 July 1995)  
 C.G. Jung.  Chiron, 2006 
 Meetings with Jung: Conversations Recorded During the Years, 1946-1961.  Daimon Books, 1992 

 “Hysteria, a Disorder of Social Integration”, (Thesis), Bennet, E. A., 1930.
 The Quality of Leadership (Paper)
 "The Psychopathology of Sexual Perversions". E. A. Bennet, M.C., M.D., D.P.M. Journal of the Royal Society of Medicine. June 1, 1933 
https://doi.org/10.1177/003591573302600826 

In translation:
 Jung og hans tankeverden 
 Τι είπε στ' αλήθεια ο Γιούνγκ
 A normalização como instrumento de inovação e competitividade na MPE
 Ce que jung a vraiment dit

See also
Marion Woodman

References

Further reading
 Obituary, The Lancet, 2 April 1977, 1 (8814): 763

External links
 Edward Armstrong Bennet by Glin Bennet, Dictionary of National Biography
  Catalogue of manuscripts, correspondence between Bennet and Jung, printed documents and publications by Bennet held at the Archive,

1888 births
1977 deaths
People from County Down
People educated at Campbell College
Alumni of Trinity College Dublin
Alumni of Ridley Hall, Cambridge
20th-century English Anglican priests
Royal Army Chaplains' Department officers
World War I chaplains
British Army personnel of World War I
Recipients of the Military Cross
British Army personnel of World War II
Royal Army Medical Corps officers
20th-century British medical doctors
Physicians of the Maudsley Hospital
British psychiatrists
Jungian psychologists
Irish writers
Military personnel from Northern Ireland